News 18 Kerala is a Malayalam language news television channel headquartered in Thiruvananthapuram owned by Network 18.
The launch in Kerala was part of an expansion plan of News 18 franchise in Tamil Nadu, Kerala and Assam-North East. The channels are also available on leading DTH & MSO Platforms like TataSky, Asianet Digital TV, Airtel Digital TV, videocon d2h.

See also
 Network 18
 CNN-News18

References

External links
 News18 India's Official website

 Malayalam News
 Malayalam Live TV

24-hour television news channels in India
Malayalam-language television channels
Television channels and stations established in 2016
Television stations in Thiruvananthapuram
2016 establishments in Kerala